Exit Marrakech is a 2013 German drama film written and directed by Caroline Link. It was screened in the Special Presentation section at the 2013 Toronto International Film Festival.

Cast
 Samuel Schneider as Ben
 Ulrich Tukur as Father
 Hafsia Herzi as Karima
 Josef Bierbichler as Dr. Breuer
 Marie-Lou Sellem as Lea

References

External links
 

2013 films
2013 drama films
German drama films
Moroccan drama films
2010s German-language films
2010s Arabic-language films
Films set in Morocco
Films directed by Caroline Link
2013 multilingual films
German multilingual films
Moroccan multilingual films
2010s German films